The men's doubles of the 2016 Advantage Cars Prague Open tournament was played on clay in Prague, Czech Republic.

Wesley Koolhof and Matwé Middelkoop were the defending champions but chose not to defend their title.

Julian Knowle and Igor Zelenay won the title after defeating Facundo Argüello and Julio Peralta 6–4, 7–5 in the final.

Seeds

Draw

References

External Links
 Main Draw

Advantage Cars Prague Open - Men's Doubles
Advantage Cars Prague Open